Sweagerbosk (Low Saxon: Swoagerbosk) is a village in Noardeast-Fryslân municipality in the province Friesland of the Netherlands. It had a population of around 638 in January 2017. Before 2019, the village was part of the Kollumerland en Nieuwkruisland municipality.

Its people speak a dialect of the standard Wood Frisian: Westereendersk dialect.

The village was first mentioned in 1861 as het Bosch, and means forest belonging to Kollumersweach. Settlement started in the 18th century. The region around Sweagerbosk consisted mainly of heath. In 1940, it was officially listed as a village.

References

External links

Noardeast-Fryslân
Populated places in Friesland